Ustadz Abdulkarim "Kharz" Tan Misuari is a Moro Filipino who is a member of the Bangsamoro Transition Authority Parliament.

Early life
He is the eldest son of six children of Moro National Liberation Front (MNLF) founder Nur Misuari and Desdemona Tan of Sulu. Kharz Misuari was born in December 1974 in Malaysia on the first year of his parents' life in exile which would last for at least two decades. He would spend his life outside the Philippines; in Libya, Egypt, Pakistan, Saudi Arabia and Syria.

Career

Moro National Liberation Front
Misuari would serve as Vice Chair of the MNLF under the leadership of his father. He initially trained as a commander to fight for the MNLF but became an ustad instead following the wish of his mother. He also served as chief liaison officer in the Gulf States for the MNLF.

Bangsamoro government
Misuari along with his stepsister Nurredha Ibrahim Misuari was appointed to the Bangsamoro Transition Authority Parliament by President Bongbong Marcos on August 12, 2022.

References

Members of the Bangsamoro Transition Authority Parliament
1974 births
Living people
Filipino Muslims
Tausūg people
Moro National Liberation Front members